Argyrophodes is a genus of moths of the family Crambidae.

Species
Argyrophorodes angolensis Agassiz, 2012 (from Angola, Congo and Zambia)
Argyrophorodes anosibalis  Marion, 1957 (from Madagascar)
Argyrophorodes catalalis  (Marion & Viette, 1956) (from Madagascar)
Argyrophorodes dubiefalis  Viette, 1978 (from Madagascar)
Argyrophorodes grisealis  Marion, 1957 (from Madagascar)
Argyrophorodes hydrocampalis  Marion, 1957 (from Madagascar)
Argyrophorodes suttoni 	Agassiz, 2012 (from Congo )

References

Acentropinae
Crambidae genera